Melissa Lasko-Gross (known professionally as Miss Lasko-Gross) is an American comics creator, known for her semi-autobiographical graphic novels Escape from "Special" and A Mess of Everything.

Early life
Melissa Lasko was born in Boston, Massachusetts in 1977. She grew up reading comics, with her favorite ones ranging from Fantastic Four to Love and Rockets.

Career
In high school, Miss began to create her own self-published comic series, Aim, which she promoted by doing consignments with local comic book stores. It was at this point that she became a member of the comic book community. She said she found more kinship with comic creators than with comic fans, as they could bond over the process of producing a comic.

Lasko-Gross has published two graphic novels, Escape from "Special" and A Mess of Everything through Fantagraphics. The first, based loosely on the author's life growing up as a Jewish girl in the suburbs, was published in 2008 and earned her a nomination for YALSA's 2008 Great Graphic Novel award. A Mess of Everything, a sequel of sorts to her first book, was also well received, as it was named one of Booklist's top 10 graphic novels of the year in 2010.

Lasko-Gross is currently working on a series called Henni about "cute animals and religious fundamentalism in a horrible, twisted marriage" for an iPhone app, as well as a long term novel project that chronicles the experience of a burn victim of an explosion.

Bibliography 
 Henni (Z2 Comics, 2015)
 A Mess of Everything (Fantagraphics, 2009)
 Escape from "Special" (Fantagraphics, 2006)
 Aim (self-published, 1993–2001)

References

External links

 Official website
 
 Escape from Special and A Mess of Everything. Fantagraphics
 Miss Lasko-Gross Writers House
 Washington Post Interview

1977 births
American comics writers
American female comics artists
Living people